Etain (also Étain, Étáin) can refer to:

 Étaín, a character from Irish mythology
 the fairy princess in Rutland Boughton's opera The Immortal Hour
 the fairy princess in the play The Immortal Hour (play)
 Étain, Meuse, a commune in the Meuse département in France
 Étain-Rouvres Air Base (also Étain Air Base), former name of Base Lieutenant Étienne Mantoux
 Étain, the French word for tin or pewter